KQNU (102.3 FM, "Q102") is a radio station broadcasting a hot adult contemporary format. The station is licensed to Onawa, Iowa, and serves Sioux City, Iowa, broadcasting from a tower east of Walthill, Nebraska on the Omaha Indian Reservation. KQNU is owned by Powell Broadcasting. The station had had the KZSR calls and previously been known as "Bob FM" until the name changed to Jack FM in September 2008.

On September 24, 2009, KZSR flipped to a Modern AC format branded as "New 102.3" with the KQNU calls. The station has been known as “Q102” since August 31, 2012.

External links

Hot adult contemporary radio stations in the United States
QNU
Radio stations established in 1986
1986 establishments in Iowa